"Kan du vissla, Johanna?" is a song with music by Sten Axelson, and lyrics by Åke Söderblom. It was originally recorded in 1932 by many artists.

References

1932 songs
Swedish-language songs
Swedish songs